The following is an overview of the events of 1895 in film, including a list of films released and notable births.

Events
 February–March – Robert W. Paul and Birt Acres build and run the first working 35 mm movie camera in Britain, the Kineopticon. Their first films include Incident at Clovelly Cottage, The Oxford and Cambridge University Boat Race and Rough Sea at Dover.
 In France, the brothers Auguste and Louis Lumière, design and built a lightweight, hand-held motion picture camera called the Cinématographe. They discover that their machine can also be used to project images onto a large screen. The Lumière brothers create several short films at this time that are considered to be pivotal in the history of motion pictures.
 February 13 – Auguste and Louis Lumière patent the Cinematographe, a combination movie camera and projector.
 March 22 – First display of motion pictures by Auguste and Louis Lumière (private screening).
 May 27 – Birt Acres patents the Kineopticon under his own name.
 Late September – C. Francis Jenkins and Thomas Armat demonstrate their Phantoscope, a motion picture projector, in Atlanta, Georgia at the Cotton States and International Exposition.
November – In Germany, Emil and Max Skladanowsky develop their own film projector.
 December 28 – The Lumière brothers have their first paying audience at the Grand Café Boulevard des Capucines in Paris — this date is sometimes considered the debut of the motion picture as an entertainment medium.
 December 30 – The American Mutoscope and Biograph Company motion pictures is founded in New Jersey by the KMCD Syndicate of William Kennedy Dickson, Henry Marvin, Herman Casler and Elias Koopman.
Annabelle the Dancer is a sensation in shorts such as Annabelle Serpentine Dance.
William Kennedy Dickson and his sister Antonia publish History of the Kinetograph, Kinetoscope, and Kinetophonograph in the United States with a preface by Thomas Edison, the first history of the subject.
Gaumont Pictures founded by the engineer-turned-inventor, Léon Gaumont. Woodville Latham and his sons develop the Latham Loop – the concept of loose loops of film on either side of the intermittent movement to prevent stress from the jerky movement. This is debuted in the Eidoloscope, which is also the first widescreen format (1.85:1).
 Herman Casler of American Mutoscope Company, a.k.a. American Mutoscope and Biograph Company manufactures the Biograph 68 mm camera, which will become the first successful large format 68mm (70mm) film.
 Henri Joly debuts his Joly-Normandin 60 mm format.

Films released in 1895

Akrobatisches Potpourri
Annabelle Serpentine Dance, directed by William Heise, starring Annabelle Moore
The Baby's Meal, directed by Louis Lumiere, starring Auguste Lumiere, (his wife) Marguerite, and (their daughter) Andrée
Bauerntanz zweier Kinder
Billy Edwards and the Unknown a.k.a. Billy Edwards Boxing
The Blacksmiths, directed by Louis Lumiere
Boat Leaving The Port, directed by Louis Lumiere
Boxing Kangaroo
Card Party, directed by Louis Lumiere
La Charcuterie mécanique
Demolition Of A Wall, directed by Louis Lumiere and starring Auguste Lumiere, the man in charge...pointing
The Derby, directed by Birt Acres
The Dickson Experimental Sound Film, directed by and starring William K. L. Dickson on violin.  First sound film.
The Execution of Mary Stuart, directed by Alfred Clark.  First special effect (stop camera edit effect) in cinema.
Incident at Clovelly Cottage, shot by Birt Acres
Fishing For Goldfish, directed by Louis Lumiere, starring Auguste Lumiere and (his daughter) Andrée
Opening of the Kiel Canal
The Oxford and Cambridge University Boat Race
Cordeliers' Square in Lyons, directed by Louis Lumiere
Photograph, directed by Louis Lumiere
The Photographical Congress Arrives in Lyon, directed by Louis Lumiere
Princess Ali a.k.a. Egyptian Dance, directed by William Heise
Rough Sea at Dover, directed by Birt Acres
Le Saut à la couverture
Serpentinen Tanz
L'Arroseur Arrosé, directed by Louis Lumiere.  May be the first outdoor comedy film ever made.
Swimming In The Sea, directed by Louis Lumiere
Transformation By Hats, Comic View, directed by Louis Lumiere
 Trilby Hypnotic Scene, directed by William Heise, produced by Thomas Edison
 Trilby Death Scene, directed by William Heise, produced by Thomas Edison
La Voltige
Das Wintergartenprogramm, directed by Max Skladanowsky
Workers Leaving the Lumière Factory, directed by Louis Lumiere

Births

External links

References

 
Film by year